is a Japanese backstroke swimmer. He is a Waseda University student in Tokyo.

In May 2009, he set the Japanese records in the 50 m and 100 m backstrokes at the 2009 Japan Championships, qualifying for Japan's team to the 2009 World Championships.

Personal bests
In long course
 50m backstroke 24.24 Asian record (August 1, 2009)
 100m backstroke 52.26 (July 28, 2009)

References

 Koga's profile from TV Asahi; retrieved 2009-07-29.

External links
JunyaKoga official site
official blog(じゅんやこがの夢のような日記) 

1987 births
Living people
Japanese male freestyle swimmers
Japanese male backstroke swimmers
World Aquatics Championships medalists in swimming
Asian Games medalists in swimming
Swimmers at the 2006 Asian Games
Swimmers at the 2010 Asian Games
Swimmers at the 2014 Asian Games
Asian Games gold medalists for Japan
Asian Games silver medalists for Japan
Swimmers at the 2016 Summer Olympics
Olympic swimmers of Japan
Medalists at the FINA World Swimming Championships (25 m)
Medalists at the 2006 Asian Games
Medalists at the 2010 Asian Games
Medalists at the 2014 Asian Games
Universiade medalists in swimming
Universiade gold medalists for Japan
Universiade silver medalists for Japan
Universiade bronze medalists for Japan
Medalists at the 2007 Summer Universiade
Medalists at the 2009 Summer Universiade
20th-century Japanese people
21st-century Japanese people